This article displays the qualifying draw of the 2011 Internazionali Femminili di Palermo.

Players

Seeds
{{columns-list|colwidth=30em|
  Lara Arruabarrena-Vecino ''(qualifying competition) (lucky loser)  Ajla Tomljanović (second round)  Laura Thorpe (second round)  Liana Ungur (first round)  Kristina Mladenovic (second round)  Sesil Karatantcheva (qualified)
  Karin Knapp (qualified)
  Beatriz García Vidagany (first round)''
}}

Qualifiers

Lucky losers
  Lara Arruabarrena-Vecino'''

Qualifying draw

First qualifier

Second qualifier

Third qualifier

Fourth qualifier

References
 Qualifying Draw

2011 - qualifying
Internazionali Femminili di Palermo - qualifying